The Third International 500-Mile Sweepstakes Race was held at the Indianapolis Motor Speedway on Friday, May 30, 1913. Frenchman Jules Goux became the first foreign-born, and first European winner of the Indianapolis 500. His margin of victory of 13 minutes, 8 seconds (approximately 7 laps) over second place Spencer Wishart still stands, as of 2022, as the largest margin of victory in Indy history.

Race Summary

After the entries in the first two years of the Indianapolis 500 had been almost exclusively American, 1913 saw six drivers travel to the United States from Europe to enter, likely attracted by the impressive $20,000 first prize. A total of 27 cars would meet the 75 mile per hour qualifying speed, led by Jack Tower at 88.230 mph. The starting grid was determined by a random draw of names, and Caleb Bragg would be given the pole.

Tower's car turned over on the southwest turn on lap 51, causing him to sustain a broken leg and his riding mechanic, Lee Dunning, to break three ribs. Bob Burman started the race as the favorite, and led 41 laps early, before his car caught fire on lap 55. Burman was able to repair his car and continue, however continuing problems led to several more stops and a replacement driver, who brought the car home in eleventh (unfortunately only the top ten finishers received prize money).

French-born Jules Goux, driving a car owned and manufactured by Peugeot (where his father was the factory Supervisor) would lead the race on four occasions. Bob Evans dueled with Goux, leading laps 125–135, but would be forced out of the race on lap 158 due to a mechanical problem. Goux would dominate the remainder of the race, leading 138 laps en route to a victory of a more than 13 minute margin, making him the first non-American winner of the 500. The car contained a four-cylinder dual overhead camshaft engine, which would serve as a model for many future entries. Goux would state after the race that his manager forced him stay below the car's top speed, feeling the lead was safe. Spencer Wishart was the top finishing American in second, while two of the other European cars would finish fourth and fifth.

Rules at the time required the top ten drivers to finish the full 500 miles to receive prize money. This led to an interesting sight for spectators who remained after Goux's finish. Charlie Merz, in contention for second place, would have his car catch fire towards the end of lap 199. Merz, not wishing to surrender the prize money, drove the final lap on fire, while Harry Martin, his riding mechanic, crawled out on top of the hood of the still moving car to beat at the flames and release the straps the held the engine cover to allow the fire to be extinguished faster. Merz finished third. Martin would unfortunately be killed while helping test a car on the speedway less than two months later.

Champagne
Urban legends claim that race winner Jules Goux consumed "six bottles of champagne" en route to victory. However, that claim is believed to be exaggerated. Instead, during Goux's six pit stops, only four bottles (each  pint) were shared between himself and his riding mechanic Emil Begin, with each taking some sips, but likely not enough to become intoxicated. Other swigs were spit out using the champagne as a mouthwash. It was a hot day, and given the punishing conditions, during his first pit stop Goux was quoted as saying "Rustle me a pint of wine or I'll blow" After the race, in victory lane, Goux stated "The heat was terrible. I suffered and but for the wine, I should have been unable to drive this race." In subsequent years, AAA officials banned the consumption of alcohol during competition.

Official results

Qualification results
 Entries required to complete one lap in excess of 75 mph (120.7 km/h) to qualify, but starting grid determined by blind draw from a hat the night preceding the race.

Race results
 Race finishing times recorded down to one-twentieth-second intervals.
 All entries still running at conclusion scored ahead of non-finishing entries, regardless of race completion percentage.

 * Several sources claim Zuccarelli's entry to have carried the numerical designation #15. Photographs taken of entries qualified for the 1913 race, however, exhibit #45 prominently displayed on the Peugeot's front-facing engine grill.
 † De Palma is usually shown as American, but his application for a US passport (available at ) reveals that he did not become a US citizen until 1920

Race details
For 1913, riding mechanics were required.

Notes

Works cited
 Indianapolis 500 Chronicle, 1999, Rick Pope
 2006 Indianapolis 500 Official Program

References

Indianapolis 500 races
Indianapolis 500
Indianapolis 500
Indianapolis 500
May 1913 sports events